Akiva Jaap Vroman (21 May 1912 in Gouda – 1989 in Herzliya) was an Israeli geologist.

Biography 
Vroman was born in the Netherlands, where he studied geology and theology at the Utrecht University. He immigrated to the then British Mandate of Palestine (now Israel) in 1940, having previously lived there in mid-1930s. In 1936, he pursued geological work in Zichron Ya'akov, studying the geological history of the Carmel Mountains. He married Gonny Betsy DeLeo, with whom he had three daughters, all born in Jerusalem.

Scientific career
In 1939, he published his doctoral thesis, "Geology of the Region of Southwest Carmel (Palestine). in 1940, he was invited to work as a geologist in Palestine. He joined Hebrew University professor Leo Picard, head of the Department of Geology on Mount Scopus. In 1945-1948, he served as the field geologist of the Jordan Exploration Company, which was searching for oil in the region of Ein Gedi. He drew up maps of the region, including Masada and Sodom. During the 1948 Arab-Israeli War, Vroman worked for the Mapping and Photography Department of the Israel Defense Force. After the Siege of Jerusalem, he joined Yaacov Bendor on a mission to map the Negev desert in a search for oil, water and mineral deposits.

In 1950, Vroman moved to Haifa to teach at the Technion.

In 1964, Vroman studied aerial photography techniques in France.

Awards and recognition 
 In 1955, Vroman was awarded the Israel Prize, for the life sciences.

See also 
List of Israel Prize recipients

References 

1912 births
1989 deaths
Dutch emigrants to Mandatory Palestine
20th-century Dutch geologists
Dutch Jews
Israel Prize in life sciences recipients
Israel Prize in life sciences recipients who were geologists
Israeli geologists
People from Gouda, South Holland
Academic staff of Technion – Israel Institute of Technology
Utrecht University alumni
20th-century geologists